The 2019–20 Scottish Premiership (known as the Ladbrokes Premiership for sponsorship reasons) was the seventh season of the Scottish Premiership, the highest division of Scottish football. The fixtures were published on 21 June 2019 and the season began on 3 August 2019. Celtic were the defending champions.

Twelve teams contested the league: Aberdeen, Celtic, Hamilton Academical, Heart of Midlothian, Hibernian, Kilmarnock, Livingston, Motherwell, Rangers, Ross County, St Johnstone and St Mirren.

On 13 March 2020, the Scottish football season was suspended with immediate effect due to the COVID-19 pandemic. The Premiership was curtailed on 18 May 2020, with average points per game used to determine final league positions. As a result, Celtic were awarded a ninth consecutive title, whilst Hearts were relegated to the Championship, a decision which prompted the Edinburgh-based club to pursue legal action.

Teams
The following teams have changed division since the 2018–19 season.

Promoted from Scottish Championship
Ross County

Relegated to Scottish Championship
Dundee

Stadia and locations

Personnel and kits

Managerial changes

Format
In the initial phase of the season, the 12 teams play a round-robin tournament whereby each team plays each one of the other teams three times. After 33 games, the league splits into two sections of six teams, with each team playing each other in that section. The league attempts to balance the fixture list so that teams in the same section play each other twice at home and twice away, but sometimes this is impossible. A total of 228 matches were due be played (38 matches by each team).

League summary

League table

Positions by round

Results

Matches 1–22
Teams play each other twice, once at home and once away.

Matches 23–33
Teams play each other once, either home or away.

Matches 34–38
It was intended that after 33 matches, the league would split into two sections of six teams i.e. the top six and the bottom six, with the teams playing every other team in their section once (either at home or away). The exact matches would be determined by the position of the teams in the league table at the time of the split. However, the season's premature finish, due to the COVID-19 pandemic, meant that this split was never applied.

Season statistics

Scoring

Top scorers

Hat-tricks

Attendances
These are the average attendances of the teams.

Awards

Broadcasting

Live matches 
The SPFL permits Sky Sports and BT Sport up to six live home matches between the broadcasters from each club - although this is only four for Rangers and Celtic. Sky Sports and BT Sport's deal allows them to broadcast 30 games each (and the play-offs for BT). The deal roughly provides £21m to SPFL per season. This is the final season of the contract; from 2020–21, Sky Sports will have exclusive rights to Scottish Premiership matches.

Highlights 
Sky Sports hold the rights to Saturday night highlights - however, they do not broadcast a dedicated programme and instead merely show the goals of the Premiership matches on Sky Sports News in their Goals Express programme - which primarily is focused on goals from the English Football League. Gaelic-language channel BBC Alba has the rights to broadcast the repeat in full of 38 Saturday 3pm matches "as live" at 5.30pm. The main Premiership highlights programme is BBC Scotland's Sportscene programme, which shows in-depth highlights of all six Premiership matches every weekend. The SPFL also uploads the goals from every Premiership match onto its YouTube channel - available from 6pm on a Sunday for UK and Ireland viewers and 10pm on a Saturday for those worldwide.

References

External links
Official website

Scottish Premiership seasons
1
1
Scot
Scotland